Anti-French sentiment in the United States has consisted of unfavorable estimations of the  French government, culture, language or people of France by people in the United States of America spurred on by media and government leaders.

18th century

The victory of the American colonists against the British was heavily dependent on the financial and military support of France. Despite the positive view of Jeffersonian Americans during the French Revolution, it awakened or created anti-French feelings among many Federalists. An ideological split was already emerging between pro-French and anti-French sentiment, with John Adams, Alexander Hamilton and their fellow Federalists taking a skeptical view of France, even as Thomas Jefferson and other Democratic-Republicans urged closer ties. As for the Revolution, many or most Federalists denounced it as far too radical and violent.  Those on the Democratic-Republican side remained broadly supportive. Pierre Bourdieu and Stanley Hoffmann have suggested that one of the roots of anti-French sentiments in the United States and anti-American sentiments in France is the claim of both countries that their social and political systems are "models" that universally apply. France's secularism was often something of an issue for the Americans. There are some similarities there to the Federalists' reaction to perceived French anti-clericalism.

In the 1790s, the French, under a new post-revolutionary government, accused the United States of collaborating with the British and proceeded to impound Britain-bound US merchant ships. Attempts at diplomacy led to the 1797 XYZ Affair and the Quasi-War fought entirely at sea between the United States and France from 1798 to 1801, heightening tensions between the two countries and leading to an increase in anti-French feelings in America.

19th and early 20th centuries

In the Southern United States, some Americans were anti-French for racist reasons. For example, John Trotwood Moore, a Southern novelist and local historian who served as the State Librarian and Archivist of Tennessee from 1919 to 1929, lambasted the French for "intermarrying with the Indians and treating them as equals" during the French colonization of the Americas.

Allegation of missing French-American lobby

French historian Justin Vaïsse has proposed that an important cause of public hostility in the US is the small number of Americans of direct or recent French descent. Most Americans of French descent are descended from 17th- and 18th-century colonists who settled in Quebec, Acadia, or Louisiana before migrating to the United States or being incorporated into American territories. French Americans of colonial era Huguenot descent, French Protestant emigrants, have often ceased identification with France.

World War II 
The rout of French forces during the German invasion of France in 1940 came as a profound shock to Americans. As details of the defeat, specifically of the general surrender of the French Army against Nazi German forces in the Armistice of 22 June 1940.
Within months of French liberation from the Germans, tensions rapidly rose between the locals and US military personnel stationed there. 112 Gripes about the French was a 1945 handbook issued by the United States military to defuse some of this hostility.

21st century
In 1990s popular culture, the derogatory phrase "cheese-eating surrender monkeys" began as a joke on The Simpsons in 1995, used by Groundskeeper Willie's character in a satirical manner. National Review contributor Jonah Goldberg claimed credit for making the term known, with its implicit characterization of the French as cowards.

France came under attack by Thomas Friedman, an American three-time Pulitzer winner and NY Times writer. In his 1999 book The Lexus and the Olive Tree Friedman says, "Buy Taiwan, hold Italy, sell France" because of France's anti-globalization stance.

Anti-French sentiment was strong in the wake of France's refusal to support US proposals in the UN Security Council for military action to invade Iraq. While other nations also opposed the US proposals (notably Russia; China; and traditional US allies, such as Germany, Canada, and Belgium), France received particularly ferocious criticism. In a New York Times article in 2003 Friedman said France's permanent seat at the U.N. Security Council should be given to India because "India is just so much more serious than France these days. France is so caught up with its need to differentiate itself from America to feel important, it's become silly".

In early 2003, George Will from The Washington Post described retreat as "an exercise for which France has often refined its savoir-faire since 1870." Anti-French displays also came in the form of bumper stickers, and t-shirts calling for the United States to invade: "Iraq first, France next!" and "First Iraq, then Chirac!" Freedom fries became a political euphemism for French fries. The term came to prominence in 2003 when the then Republican Chairman of the Committee on House Administration, Bob Ney, renamed the menu item in three Congressional cafeterias in response to France's opposition to the proposed invasion of Iraq.

See also
 Anti-Canadian sentiment
 Iraq and weapons of mass destruction

References

France–United States relations
French-American history
United States